Tlacoachistlahuaca is one of the 81 municipalities of Guerrero, in south-western Mexico. The municipal seat lies at Tlacoachistlahuaca.  The municipality covers an area of 450.6 km².

As of 2005, the municipality had a total population of 18,055.

References

Municipalities of Guerrero